Jack William Garrad Bearne (born 15 September 2001) is an English footballer who plays as a midfielder for Kidderminster Harriers, on loan from Liverpool.

Career 
Bearne made his professional debut for Liverpool on 17 December 2019, coming on as a substitute in the away match against Aston Villa in the quarter-finals of the EFL Cup.

On 1 September 2022 he joined Kidderminster Harriers on a season-long loan.

Career statistics

Club

Honours 
Liverpool Academy
 FA Youth Cup: 2018–19
 Lancashire Senior Cup: 2021–22

References

External links 
 
 
 
 

2001 births
Living people
Footballers from Nottingham
English footballers
Association football midfielders
Liverpool F.C. players
Kidderminster Harriers F.C. players